Yegyibauk is a river village on the Myitnge River in Amarapura Township, Mandalay District, in the Mandalay Region of central Burma. It is located just to the southwest of Myitnge.
The village was mentioned in the Agricultural Journal of India by the Indian Council of Agricultural Research in 1914.

References

External links
Maplandia World Gazetteer

Populated places in Mandalay District
Amarapura Township